The Softex-Aero V-51 is a Ukrainian helicopter design.

Development
The V-51 is a five place turbine powered helicopter with composite rotors. The V-52 is a closely related development.

Specifications (V-51)

References

External links
Company website
YouTube of V-51/V-52

Helicopters